Wisma Atria is an established shopping mall on Orchard Road in Singapore. The  centre, which opened on 13 November 1986, is directly linked underground to Orchard MRT station and neighbouring centres.

Wisma Atria has five levels of shopping with one basement and four levels of retail space as well as three levels of car parking space. The centre offers over 100 specialty stores anchored by Japanese department store Isetan, fashion brands Tory Burch and Coach, and local food haven Food Republic.

Location
Wisma Atria is at the intersection between Orchard Road and Scotts Road. It is next to Orchard MRT station.

History
In 1983, the Wisma Indonesia building was demolished and a shopping mall, The Wisma, was built over the site. The developer of the mall was Wisma Development Pte Ltd, a subsidiary of A. W. Galadari Pte Ltd, a Dubai company owned by the Galadari brothers.

In 1984, after Abdul Wahab Galadari's assets were seized by the United Arab Emirates's government over the Union Bank of the Middle East's dealings, one of many Galadari's companies, A. W. Galadari Pte Ltd was taken over by Dubai Bank Ltd, a bank owned by  A. W. Galadari's brothers. In 1985, the mall was renamed to Wisma Atria after the Union Bank of the Middle East took over Dubai Bank Ltd.

Wisma Atria underwent renovations in 2004 by local architect cum designers DP Architects. Notable changes include the replacement of the original blue facade with clear glass, a new Grand Entrance facing Orchard Road on Level 2, new large Wisma Atria signage on a new blue grid structure facing Orchard Road and external lighted escalators on the facade leading to Levels 3 and 4.

In the 2010s, Wisma Atria undergone renovations and it was completed in third quarter of 2012.

Gallery

References

External links
 

Shopping malls in Singapore
Commercial buildings completed in 1986
Orchard Road
Shopping malls established in 1986
1986 establishments in Singapore
20th-century architecture in Singapore